Autocycle or auto-cycle may refer to:

 Motorized bicycle, a bicycle with an attached motor
 moped
 three-wheeled car, a registration classification in the US for some three wheeled vehicles; with a sit-in cockpit and steering wheel

See also

 
 Trike (disambiguation)